Orie Montgomery Hunter III (born January 21, 1959) is a former American football safety in the National Football League (NFL) for the Dallas Cowboys and St. Louis Cardinals (NFL). He played college football at Salem College.

Early years
Hunter attended Dover High School, where he played as a running back and safety After graduation, he chose to work at the Great Plains Bag Company instead of going to college.

He walked on at NAIA Salem College, where he was a three-year starter at cornerback. As a freshman, he recorded 5 interceptions, although he only played a total of 5 snaps. 

As a junior, he had 7 interceptions. He registered 76 tackles (second on the team), 5 interceptions and returned a kickoff for a 93 yards touchdown as a senior. He finished his college career with a school record 19 interceptions.

Professional career

Dallas Cowboys
Hunter was selected by the Dallas Cowboys in the fourth round (109th overall) of the 1982 NFL Draft. He made the team as a backup safety, taking advantage of the retirements of Charlie Waters and Randy Hughes.

Because of his size, he was used as a linebacker on passing downs to cover running backs and tight ends. He is best remembered for the interception he returned for a touchdown in the first round of the playoffs against the Tampa Bay Buccaneers, that turned the game around for a 30–17 win. During the regular season, he also caused a fumble against the Buccaneers, that helped preserve a 14-9 win.

On August 27, 1983, he was waived after being passed on the depth chart by undrafted free agent Bill Bates.

St. Louis Cardinals
On August 30, 1983, he was claimed off waivers by the St. Louis Cardinals. He played in five games before being cut on October 2, to make room for cornerback Jeff Griffin.

Washington Redskins
On March 1, 1984, he was signed as a free agent by the Washington Redskins. He was released on July 31.

References

1959 births
Living people
People from Dover, Ohio
Players of American football from Ohio
American football safeties
Salem Tigers football players
Dallas Cowboys players
St. Louis Cardinals (football) players